"Forever Loving Jah" is a song by Bob Marley. It is the ninth track on Bob Marley & the Wailers' ninth album, Uprising, produced by Chris Blackwell and released by Island Records.

As of today, there is only one confirmed live performance which took place during the Uprising Tour's US leg on September 19, 1980, at the Madison Square Garden, being Marley's third-to-last concert ever.

References

1980 songs
Songs written by Bob Marley
Song recordings produced by Chris Blackwell